Owen Davidson and Billie Jean King were the defending champions but lost in the semifinals to Ilie Năstase and Rosemary Casals.

Marty Riessen and Margaret Court won in the final 6–3, 7–5 against Ilie Năstase and Rosemary Casals.

Seeds

Draw

Finals

Top half

Section 1

Section 2

Bottom half

Section 3

Section 4

References

External links
1972 US Open – Doubles draws and results at the International Tennis Federation

Mixed Doubles
US Open (tennis) by year – Mixed doubles